Tiruvottiyur, is a neighbourhood in North Chennai

Tiruvottiyur may also refer to:

 Tiruvottiyur railway station
 Tiruvottiyur taluk
 Tiruvottiyur (State Assembly Constituency)
 Tiruvottriyur Tyagayyar